Józef Pius Dziekoński (born 5 May 1844, Płock – died 4 February 1924, Warsaw) was a Polish architect and heritage conservator, a representative of the 19th-century historicism. He became the first dean at the Faculty of Architecture of the Warsaw University of Technology and co-founded the Society for the Protection of Historical Monuments (TOnZP).

Life and career
He was born on 5 May in Płock, in the Russian-partitioned part of Poland. After graduating from high school in Warsaw in 1860, he enrolled at the School of Fine Arts. In 1866, he began his studies at the Imperial Academy of Arts in Sankt Petersburg.  In 1871, he obtained the architecture degree (III Class) and in 1902, he received the title of an academician. He mostly specialized in sacral architecture and was a precursor of the so-called Vistula-Baltic style. Since 1893, he collaborated with the Committee on Research into History of Art in Poland (Komisja do Badań Historii Sztuki w Polsce). In 1906, he was one of the co-founders of the Society for the Protection of Historical Monuments (Towarzystwo Opieki nad Zabytkami Przeszłości). Among his notable pupils were architects such as Franciszek Lilpop, Hugo Kruder, Czesław Domaniewski, Józef Holewiński, Zdzisław Mączeński, Feliks Michalski, Aleksander Nieniewski, and Ludwik Panczakiewicz.
 
He was awarded the Commander's Cross of the Order of Polonia Restituta on 2 May 1922 as well as the Italian Order of St. Gregory the Great. In 1919, he received an honorary doctorate from the University of Lviv.

He died on 4 February in Warsaw and was buried at the Powązki Cemetery.

Selected projects

Gallery

See also
Gothic Revival architecture
Hilary Majewski

References

1844 births
1927 deaths
People from Płock
Architects from Warsaw
Academic staff of the Warsaw University of Technology